Hasan Mutlucan (born 1 March 1926 in İzmir- 28 December 2011 in Istanbul) was a Turkish folk music (türkü) singer.

Life and career 
His father died while he was six. In Istanbul he began working in a theatre group as an assistant decorator. Soon he took several small roles. But he preferred a music career. In the late 1940s, he attended to the conservatoire of İstanbul municipality. With his exceptionally low bass voice he was offered a position in the opera. But he preferred to sing folk songs. Among the folk songs, especially those with epic lyrics, were his favorites. After 1973, he began singing epic style songs in Turkish Radio and Television Corporation.  After the 1980 Turkish coup d'état, his songs were played so often that he was nicknamed the "singer of the coup", though he rigorously denied any association to military government and  announced that he was a democrat. After retirement he lived mostly in İzmir. He died on 28 December 2011 in İstanbul.

Album Discography

References

1926 births
2011 deaths
Turkish folk singers
Musicians from İzmir
Turkish male singers